Peter Byrom Holland (5 October 1898 – 1963) was an English footballer who played in the Football League for Blackburn Rovers and Watford.

References

1898 births
1963 deaths
English footballers
Association football forwards
English Football League players
Hull City A.F.C. players
Blackburn Rovers F.C. players
Watford F.C. players
West Ham United F.C. players
Tunbridge Wells F.C. players